Humans are a species of highly intelligent apes.

Human(s) may also refer to:

Science
 Human, any member of the genus Homo (since ca. 2.5 million years)
 Human taxonomy, the classification of the species Homo sapiens
 Archaic humans, since ca. 200,000 years
 Homo sapiens idaltu (ca. 160,000 years ago), the name given to a number of around 160,000-year-old hominid fossils found in 1997 in Herto Bouri, Ethiopia
 Homo sapiens sapiens, anatomically modern humans
 Human appearance, the outward phenotype or look of human beings
 Human variability, the range of possible values for any physical or mental characteristic of human beings
 Human behavior, the range of behaviors exhibited by humans
 Human condition, the unique features of being human
 Human nature, the distinguishing characteristics that humans tend to have independent of the influence of culture
 Human self-reflection, the capacity of humans to exercise introspection and the willingness to learn more about their fundamental nature

Arts and entertainment

Film and television
 Human (1976 film), a Mexican film directed by Gustavo Alatriste
 Human (2015 film), a documentary by Yann Arthus Bertrand
 Human (Babylon 5), the human race in the fictional world of Babylon 5
 Human (Star Wars), the human race in the fictional world of Star Wars
 Humans (TV series), a science fiction TV series about artificial intelligence and robotics
 "Human" (Stargate Universe), a television episode
 "Humans" (Zoboomafoo), a television episode
 HUMAN (TV channel), a Dutch TV channel

Music

Bands
 Human (band), a death metal/grindcore band from New Zealand
 Humans (American band), a new wave band from Santa Cruz, California
 Humans (Canadian band), an indie electronic band from Vancouver, British Columbia

Albums
 Human (Brandy album) or the title song, 2008
 Human (Death album), 1991
 Human (Joell Ortiz and Illmind album) or the title song, 2015
 Human (Leo Ku album) or the title song, 2006
 Human (Masaharu Fukuyama album) or the title song, 2014
 Human (Max Cooper album), 2014
 Human (OneRepublic album), 2021
 Human (Projected album), 2012
 Human (Rag'n'Bone Man album) or the title song (see below), 2017
 Human (Rod Stewart album) or the title song, 2001
 Human (Steve Angello album), 2018
 Human (Three Days Grace album), 2015
 Human (The Veronicas album) or the title song, 2021
 Human (Darren Criss EP) or the title song, 2010
 Human (Dodie EP) or the title song, 2019
 Human, by Gary Numan and Michael R. Smith, 1995
 Human, by Katy Steele, 2016
 Human, by Rachael Lampa, 2010
 Human, by Waylon, 2019
 Humans (album), by Bruce Cockburn, 1980
 Humanz, by Gorillaz, 2017

Songs
 "Human" (Christina Perri song), 2013
 "Human" (Goldfrapp song), 2001
 "Human" (The Human League song), 1986
 "Human" (The Killers song), 2008
 "Human" (Oscar Zia song), 2016
 "Human" (Rag'n'Bone Man song), 2016
 "Human" (Skye Sweetnam song), 2007
 "Human", by C-Tec (Cyber-Tec Project) from Cyber-Tec, 1995
 "Human", by Carpark North from All Things to All People, 2005
 "Human", by the Cheetah Girls from TCG, 2007
 "Human", by Cher Lloyd from Sorry I'm Late, 2014
 "Human", by Civil Twilight from Civil Twilight, 2010
 "Human", by Daughter from If You Leave, 2013
 "Human", by DIIV, 2011
 "Human", by Ellie Goulding from Lights, 2010
 "Human", by Emeli Sandé from Real Life, 2019
 "Human", by Gretta Ray, 2021
 "Human", by Hellyeah from Undeniable, 2016
 "Human", by Imelda May from Life Love Flesh Blood, 2017
 "Human", by Jon McLaughlin from Indiana, 2007
 "Human", by Metallica from S&M, 1999
 "Human", by the Music from The Music, 2002
 "Human", by Of Monsters and Men from Beneath the Skin, 2015
 "Human", by Oh Land from Oh Land, 2011
 "Human", by Ola from Carelessly Yours, 2014
 "Human", by OneRepublic from Oh My My, 2016
 "Human", by the Pretenders from Viva el Amor, 1999
 "Human (Like the Rest of Us)", by Trapt from DNA, 2016

Literature
 Human?, a 1954 science fiction anthology edited by Judith Merril
 Humans (novel), a 2003 Neanderthal Parallax novel by Robert J. Sawyer
 Humans: A Brief History of How We F*cked It All Up, a 2018 non-fiction book by Tom Phillips

Other media
 Human (Dungeons & Dragons), the human race in the fictional world of Dungeons & Dragons
 Human Entertainment, a former Japanese computer and video game company

Places
 Human, Iran, a village in Isfahan Province, Iran
 Human, Yazd, a village in Yazd Province, Iran
 Human, Ukraine, a town in Ukraine

Other uses
 Human (surname), a surname of German and English origin
 Humanistische Omroep, a Dutch public broadcaster known as HUMAN
 Al-Insan, "Human", 76th chapter (sura) of the Quran

See also
 Human evolution, the evolutionary process leading up to the appearance of modern humans
 List of human evolution fossils, notable hominin fossil finds relating to human evolution
 Names for the human species
 The Humans (disambiguation)
 Superhuman
 Subhuman (disambiguation)
 Posthuman
 Transhuman
 Inhumans, a Marvel Comic superhero team
 Humanoid, something that has an appearance resembling a human being
 Humanism, a philosophical and ethical stance
 Humanitarianism, a moral of kindness, benevolence, and sympathy extended to all human beings
 Humanity (disambiguation)
 Human scale